Arılı River (Laz language: Pitsxala River) is one of the main water streams of Fındıklı in the eastern Black Sea Region of Turkey.

Description  
Arılı River rises in Kaçkar Mountains in Fındıklı.

References 

Rivers of Rize Province